Vichithram is a 2022 Indian Malayalam-language film directed by Achu Vijayan, produced by Ajith Joy and Achu Vijayan under the banner Joy Movie Productions. The screenplay was written by Nikhil Ravindran. The film features Shine Tom Chacko, Balu Varghese, Lal, and Kani Kusruti. Arjun Balakrishnan is handling the cinematography and the music is composed by Jubair Muhammed along with the well known alternative hip-hop group Street Academics.

Premise 
The strange goings on at a palatial, old bungalow when a woman named Jasmine and her five sons move in is the basis of the plot. And each of the sons has a distinct personality. Jolly Chirayath portrayed the role of Jasmine.Her five sons Jackson, Joyner, Justin and twins, Stephan and Savio ; are essayed by Shine Tom Chacko, Balu Varghese, Vishnu, and real-life twins Shihan and Shiyan respectively.

Cast 

 Shine Tom Chacko as Jackson
 Balu Varghese as Joyner
 Lal as Alexander
 Kani Kusruti as Martha
 Jolly Chirayath as Jasmine
 Ketaki Narayan as Sanghamithra
 Vishnu Anand as Justin

References

External links 
 

2022 films
2020s Malayalam-language films